Kim Soo-mi (born Kim Young-ok on September 3, 1949) is a South Korean actress. She has had a prolific career in film and television. Kim debuted in a talent contest in 1970, then shot to fame in Country Diaries. The landmark TV series aired for almost 20 years, making Kim one of the most popular Korean actresses of the 1980s.

In 2003 she made a memorable cameo as a profanity-spouting ajumma in the Jang Nara comedy Oh! Happy Day. It successfully revamped her image and rejuvenated her fading career. Kim quickly became known in the Korean entertainment industry as the "Queen of Ad-lib," with her comic talent showcased in many of her succeeding projects, notably Mapado, Twilight Gangsters, Granny's Got Talent (2015), and the Marrying the Mafia sequels.

Kim also gained attention for her turns in more serious fare, such as 2006's Barefoot Ki-bong, a heartwarming pic about a developmentally disabled man. Her 2011 film Late Blossom is a romance between two elderly couples, a topic rarely explored in Korean cinema. The low-budget indie became a sleeper hit, and for her portrayal of an Alzheimer's-afflicted woman, Kim won Best Supporting Actress at the Blue Dragon Film Awards.

Other activities
In 1998, Kim's chauffeur-driven BMW shot backward, killing her mother-in-law. Kim filed a  lawsuit against BMW, alleging that the sudden-start had been a car defect. The Seoul District Court ruled in the automaker's favor in 2003, saying that it was unclear whether the accident was caused by driver error or a sudden-start. Kim filed an appeal at the Seoul High Court.

She headed the publicity as part of the organizing committee of the 1999 Hanam International Environment Expo.

Since 2003, Kim has been the chairman of the Department of Theater and Film at Soongsil University's College of Social Sciences.

Filmography

Film

 Ghost Police (TBA) 
Mr. Zoo: The Missing VIP (2020)
Enemies In-Law (2015, cameo)
Granny's Got Talent (2015)
Born to Sing (2013)
Woosoossi (2012, cameo)
Marrying the Mafia IV: Unstoppable Family (2011)
Hoodwinked Too! Hood vs. Evil (2011, Korean dubbing)
The Suicide Forecast (2011, cameo)
Meet the In-Laws (2011)
Shotgun Love (2011)
Late Blossom (2011)
Twilight Gangsters aka Pistol Bandit Band (2010)
Fortune Salon (2009)
Black Heart aka Delivering Love aka Beyond All Magic (2008) 
Underground Rendezvous (2007)
Unstoppable Marriage (2007)
Mapado 2: Back to the Island (2007, cameo)
Marrying the Mafia III: Family Hustle (2006)
Dasepo Naughty Girls (2006)
Detective Mr. Gong aka Detective ODD (2006)
Barefoot Ki-bong (2006)
Now and Forever (2006)
Hoodwinked! (2006, Korean dubbing)
Oh! My God (2006)
Ssunday Seoul (2006)
Mapado (2005)
Mr. Housewife (Quiz King) (2005)
Marrying the Mafia II: Enemy-in-law (2005)
A Bold Family (2005)
Mr. Gam's Victory aka Superstar Mr. Gam (2004)
The Greatest Expectation (2003)
Oh! Happy Day (2003, cameo)
Downfall (1997)
Boss (1996)
Brave Trio (1988)
Blitz of Ureme from Outer Space (1987)
Ureme 4: Thunder V Operation (1987)
Milky Way in Blue Sky (1984)
Hwa-sun (1982)
Cuckoo's Dolls (1976)

Television series

Call My Agent! (2022) - Cameo 
Man in the Kitchen (2017)
Unni is Alive ( 2017)
4 Legendary Witches (2014)
The Eldest (2013)
Incarnation of Money (2013)
Ohlala Couple (2012)
Vampire Idol (2011)   
Bravo, My Love! (2011)
Daring Women (2010)
Unstoppable Marriage (2007)
The King and I (2007)
Love Needs a Miracle (2005)
Hello Franceska Season 3 (2005) 
Beating Heart (2005)
Cute or Crazy (2005)
What Happened in Bali (2004)
MBC Best Theater "내 딸 소란이" (2003)
See You in the Morning (2001)
Meeting (1999)
누룽지 선생과 감자 일곱 개 (1999)
You're One-of-a-Kind (1999)
The King's Path (1998)
Beautiful Lady (1997)
A Bluebird Has It (1997)
Illusion (1996)
Salted Mackerel (1996)
Their Embrace (1996)
Asphalt Man (1995)
Our Sunny Days of Youth (1995)
Professor Oh's Family (1993)
마포 무지개 (1992)
말로만 중산층 (1991)
That Woman (1990)
마당 깊은 집 (1990)
유산 (1989)
Your Toast (1989)
The Face of a City (1987)
The Season of Men (1985)
Father & Son (1983)
Park Soon-kyeong (1982)
Sae-ah (1981)
Angry Eyes (1981)
Country Diaries aka Lifetime in the Country (1980-2002)
엄마 아빠 좋아 (1979)
You (1977)
Samiingok (1976)
한백년 (1973)
Adada (1972)

Television show
The President's People (2022) 
Ghost worm (2021)
Soo Mi’s Mountain Cabin (2021) 
Soomi's Side Dishes(2018)
A Look at Myself (2015)
Mamado (2013)
Show King (Global Korean Talk Show King) (2011-2012) 
Soo-mi Ok (2011)
Sunday Sunday Night: Age of Charm (2005)
Kim Soo-mi's Cooking of the Day (1982-1985)

Music video
"Countryside Life" - T-ara N4 (2013)
"Your Sister, Instead of You"  - EZ-Life (2005)

Theater
My Mother (2023) - Bongran 
My Mother (2010-2013)  
A Midsummer Night's Dream (2005)
너를 보면 살고 싶다 (1998)

Radio program
The Pursuit of Happiness with Kim Soo-mi and Kang Nam-gil (KBS, 1995)
Hello, This is Kim Hong-shin and Kim Soo-mi (MBC, 1993-1995)

Books
얘들아, 힘들면 연락해! (2009)	
맘놓고 먹어도 살 안 쪄요 (2003)
그해 봄, 나는 중이 되고 싶었다 (2003)
Kim Soo-mi's Jeolla Food Stories (1998)
I'm Sorry, I Love You (1997)
나는 가끔 도망가 버리고 싶다 (1993)
그리운 것은 말하지 않겠다 (1991)
너를 보면 살고 싶다 (1990)

Ambassadorship 
 Ambassadors for Island Day (2022)
 Ambassador for Gwangju World Kimchi Festival (2022)
 Jeonbuk's Honorary Ambassador (2022)

Awards
2013 SBS Drama Awards: Achievement Award (Incarnation of Money)
2011 32nd Blue Dragon Film Awards: Best Supporting Actress (Late Blossom) 
2007 1st Korean Movie Star Awards: Best Actress Who Made Us Laugh Award (Marrying the Mafia III)
2006 3rd Max Movie Awards: Best Supporting Actress
2006 14th Chunsa Film Art Awards: Best Supporting Actress (Barefoot Ki-bong)
2005 26th Blue Dragon Film Awards: Popular Star Award (Mapado, Marrying the Mafia II)
1986 22nd Baeksang Arts Awards: Most Popular Actress, TV category (Country Diaries)
1986 MBC Drama Awards: Grand Prize/Daesang (Country Diaries, The Season of Men)
1985 MBC Drama Awards: Top Excellence Award, Actress (Country Diaries)
1982 Our Star Awards: Recipient
1981 MBC Drama Awards: Excellence Award, Actress (Country Diaries)
1978 MBC Drama Awards: Top Excellence Award, Actress
1975 MBC Drama Awards: Excellence Award, Actress
1972 MBC Drama Awards: Best New Actress (Adada)

References

External links
 
 
 

1949 births
Living people
People from Gunsan
South Korean film actresses
South Korean television actresses
South Korean stage actresses
South Korean television presenters
South Korean broadcasters
South Korean women television presenters
VJs (media personalities)
20th-century South Korean actresses
21st-century South Korean actresses